The Loyal White Knights of the Ku Klux Klan is a group styled after the original Ku Klux Klan (KKK). Formed around 2012, it aims to "restore America to a White, Christian nation founded on God's word".

The organization presents itself as part of a "new KKK". By rejecting the hate group label, it proclaims itself a "non-violent pro-white civil rights movement." Unlike the Protestant second Ku Klux Klan (1915–1944), the group unites white-supremacist Christians of different denominations. It is however somewhat stricter than other contemporary KKK chapters in accepting only "native-born white American Citizen[s …] of Christian Faith" who "believe in White Supremacy and 100% Americanism."

Activism
In a 2014 recruiting campaign, the group left flyers near cars as well as in driveways in predominantly white neighborhoods of Texas, Louisiana, Illinois, Pennsylvania, South Carolina, and Georgia.

In July 2015, members of the Loyal White Knights, which is currently considered the largest KKK chapter, and members of the Trinity White Knights protested against the removal of the Confederate flag from the South Carolina State House in Columbia, South Carolina. Their rally in front of the State House was also attended by members of other KKK chapters, members of the Neo-Nazi National Socialist Movement, and Christian fundamentalists. According to press reports, protesters waved Nazi flags, and chanted racial slurs before they clashed with black counter-protesters.

Chris Barker, the group's "Imperial Wizard" was noted as the organizer of a "White lives matter" demonstration on March 2, 2016 in Anaheim, California, when KKK members attacked counter-protesters, triggering a fight when a KKK member stabbed a counter-protester with a flagpole. His compatriot Will Quigg, the "California Grand Dragon West Coast King Kleagle" of the Loyal White Knights and as such in charge of the area from Texas to the Pacific, was attacked. Brian Levin, a professor and the director of the Centre for the Study of Hate and Extremism at California State University, San Bernardino, intervened, saving Quigg from further harm. Quigg proceeded to play down the Holocaust and he also blamed Jews for what he called "white cultural genocide". Quigg supported Donald Trump early in the primaries of the 2016 United States presidential election. However, in March 2016, Quigg changed his endorsement to Hillary Clinton, claiming that she has a "hidden agenda", although questions have been raised by Snopes over the sincerity of his endorsement.

In 2017, members of the group participated in the Unite the Right rally in Charlottesville, Virginia alongside members of the Confederate White Knights of the Ku Klux Klan, members of the alt-right, neo-Nazis, white nationalists/supremacists, Southern nationalists/neo-Confederates, Identitarians, members of the American Guard, Fraternal Order of the Knights, certain members of the Proud Boys, and members of various militia groups. Earlier on July 8, 50 members of the Loyal White Knights of the Ku Klux Klan had held a rally in Charlottesville which was denounced by hundreds of counter-protesters. In July 2017, Chris Barker was interviewed by Univision's Ilia Calderón. During the interview, he called Calderón a racial slur and stated that his group was going "to burn you out". In reference to immigrants, He also stated: "We killed 6 million Jews the last time (a reference to the Holocaust). Eleven million is nothing" (referencing the illegal immigrant population of  America).

Also in 2017 around Valentine's Day, members distributed fliers inviting people to join the chapter. These flyers were left on driveways as well as in mailboxes around Grand Junction, Colorado.

References

Christian organizations based in the United States
Christian organizations established in the 21st century
Organizations established in 2012
Ku Klux Klan organizations
Organizations based in North Carolina
2012 establishments in North Carolina
Anti-abortion organizations in the United States
Ku Klux Klan in North Carolina